Donald F. Nichols Covered Bridge is a Covered Bridge on the Kal-Haven Trail. The bridge is a 108-foot long covered footbridge.  The bridge is located near the South Haven (West) trail-head.  The Kal-Haven Trail has seven bridges along the trail that were historic railroad bridge.  These bridge were built when the original railroad was built in 1870.  The trestle railroad bridge was turned into a covered bridge as part of the conversion of old railroad bed to public trail.

Original bridge 
The original bridge was built by the Kalamazoo and South Haven Railroad. lack of money caused the railroads future to be placed in the possibility of the new company folding and not completing the rail line. Michigan Central Railroad leased the route and bought bonds in the Kalamazoo and South Haven Railroad savings the line.

Community leaders wanted the railroad to come to their communities because they can provide access to South Haven's harbor which could give them access to the great lakes.

Liberty Hyde Bailey Jr. skipped school to see the new Kalamazoo & South Haven Railroad's new bridge over the Black River. "the most wonderful engineering feat in all the world."

Conversion 
The bridge was built in its current form by the Michigan Civilian Conservation Corps over the Black River. The Michigan Civilian Conservation Corp that performed the work was a nine-member group that had covered the former railroad trestles for use for bicycles. The Michigan Civilian Conservation Corp of 1988 was made up of 500 previously unemployed people from 18 to 25 who worked for one year earning minimum wage instead of getting welfare.

The bridge is named after a local resident, his family (Robert Nichols) donated the material to convert the bridge from a trestle railroad bridge to a covered bridge after his death.

Donald F. Nichols 
Donald and his wife were the owners of the Nichols Hotel in South Haven, Michigan.  Donald died at the age of 72 in 1981, his wife Elizabeth in 2001.  The hotel, established in 1926 by Ward Webster, was an amalgamation of three buildings built in the 1880s. The Webster Hotel was sold to Don Nichols in 1944 and renamed the Hotel Nichols.  It was kept in the Nichols family until sold in 2002.

References 

Covered bridges in Michigan